Hardin County is a county located in the U.S. state of Illinois. According to the 2020 census, it has a population of 3,649, making it the least populous county in Illinois. Its county seat is Elizabethtown. Hardin County is located in the part of the state known as Little Egypt. Hardin County was named for Hardin County, Kentucky, which was named in honor of Colonel John Hardin, an officer in the American Revolutionary War and the Northwest Indian War.

History
Hardin County was formed in 1839 from Pope County. Additional area was later added from Gallatin County. Hardin County was named for Hardin County, Kentucky, which was named in honor of Colonel John Hardin, an officer in the American Revolutionary War and the Northwest Indian War. Hardin was murdered by Shawnee Indians while he was on a peace mission in 1792 for President George Washington, in what is now Shelby County, Ohio. In the 1790s and early 1800s, the Hardin County area, especially Cave-In-Rock, was notorious as a stronghold used by outlaws, bandits, river pirates, and counterfeiters.

Geography

It is the second-smallest county in Illinois by area.

Hicks Dome is a geological feature in Hardin County. The Hicks Dome is underlain by ultramafic igneous rocks and igneous diatremes or breccia pipes. Most geologists accept the theory that the older rocks at the center of the uplift are a result of this deep-seated igneous activity. This activity may also have provided the fluorine in the fluorspar deposits in the region. Fluorspar, or calcium fluoride, was mined in Hardin County until the early 1990s.

Climate and weather

Adjacent counties
 Gallatin County - north
 Union County, Kentucky - east
 Crittenden County, Kentucky - south
 Livingston County, Kentucky - southwest
 Pope County - west
 Saline County - northwest

Major highways
  Illinois Route 1
  Illinois Route 34
  Illinois Route 146

National protected area
 Shawnee National Forest (part)

Demographics

As of the 2010 census, there were 4,320 people, 1,915 households, and 1,234 families residing in the county. The racial makeup of the county was 97.3% white, 0.6% American Indian, 0.5% Asian, 0.3% black or African American, 0.1% Pacific islander, 0.3% from other races, and 0.8% from two or more races. Those of Hispanic or Latino origin made up 1.3% of the population. In terms of ancestry, 26.5% were Irish, 23.8% were German, 10.4% were English, and 4.3% were American.

Of the 1,915 households, 26.0% had children under the age of 18 living with them, 50.9% were married couples living together, 9.2% had a female householder with no husband present, 35.6% were non-families, and 31.7% of all households were made up of individuals. The average household size was 2.25 and the average family size was 2.78. The median age was 46.3 years.

The median income for a household in the county was $27,578 and the median income for a family was $38,576. Males had a median income of $42,955 versus $26,683 for females. The per capita income for the county was $18,515. About 17.4% of families and 22.3% of the population were below the poverty line, including 37.4% of those under age 18 and 14.6% of those age 65 or over.

Communities

City
 Rosiclare

Villages
 Cave-In-Rock
 Elizabethtown

Unincorporated communities
 Cadiz
 Eichorn
 Finneyville
 Gross
 Hicks
 Karbers Ridge
 Lamb
 Loves Corner
 Peters Creek
 Rock Creek
 Saline Landing
 Shetlerville
 Sparks Hill

Precincts
 Cave-In-Rock Precinct
 East Rosiclare Precinct
 McFarlan Precinct
 Monroe Precinct
 Rock Precinct
 Rosiclare Precinct
 Stone Church Precinct
 West Rosiclare Precinct

Ghost towns
 Battery Rock
 Chambers Creek
 Fairview Landing
 Grosville
 Hall Ridge
 Hester
 Illinois Furnace
 Lambtown
 Martha Furnace
 McFarlan
 Parkinson's Landing
 Robin's Ferry
 Sellers
 Sellers Landing
 Twitchell's Mills
 Wolrab Mills

Notable people
 James Ford (1775-1833), civic leader and secret criminal leader of a gang of Ohio River pirates and highwaymen
 James Karber (1914–1976), Illinois lawyer, businessman, and politician
 Isaiah L. Potts (1784?-after 1843), tavern keeper of the notorious Potts Tavern who, allegedly, ran a gang of pirates and highwaymen
 Jennifer Rhodes (1947-), television and film actress from Rosiclare
 Sturdivant Gang, 19th century counterfeiters in Rosiclare

Politics

In its early history, Hardin County was opposed to the “Yankee” Republican Party and its Civil War against the South – with whom it was closely allied both culturally and economically. It did not vote for a Republican presidential candidate until Theodore Roosevelt’s 1904 landslide.

Since 1904, however, Hardin County has turned powerfully Republican. Like the nearby counties of Johnson, Massac and Pope, it managed to remain loyal to William Howard Taft during the 1912 election when the Republican Party was mortally divided. Hardin County would next be carried by a Democratic presidential candidate in Franklin D. Roosevelt’s 1932 landslide victory, and not after that until Lyndon Johnson in 1964. The county did trend Democratic in the following three decades, actually voting more Democratic than the nation at-large between 1972 and 1996. Nonetheless, since 2000 Hardin County has followed the same political trajectory as Tennessee, Missouri, Kentucky, West Virginia and Appalachian regions of adjacent states, whereby the Democratic Party's liberal views on social issues have produced dramatic swings to the Republican Party amongst its almost entirely Southern white population. The past six Presidential elections have observed a swing totalling 79 percentage points to the GOP, with Hillary Clinton in 2016 receiving barely half the proportion of the worst-performing Democrat from before 2010.

See also
 National Register of Historic Places listings in Hardin County, Illinois

References 
 History of Hardin County

External links
 Hardin County tourism page
 Harden County History

 
Illinois counties
1839 establishments in Illinois
Populated places established in 1839
Illinois counties on the Ohio River
Hardin County, Illinois